Oliver Adler (born 14 October 1967) is a retired German football goalkeeper.

References

1967 births
Living people
German footballers
Schwarz-Weiß Essen players
FC Viktoria Köln players
Rot-Weiß Oberhausen players
KSV Hessen Kassel players
2. Bundesliga players
Association football goalkeepers
Footballers from Duisburg